Nerita polita is a species of sea snail, a marine gastropod mollusk in the family Neritidae.

The subspecies Nerita polita rumphii Récluz, 1841: synonym of Nerita litterata Gmelin, 1791

Description
Nerita polita has a distinctively smooth and polished shell that is up to 4 cm in size. It has a smooth columella with 2-4 weak teeth on the edge. The color is variable: mottled grey, red or cream, sometimes with axial bands. The operculum is smooth, and is cream to black in color.

Distribution
The distribution of Nerita polita is summarized as Indo-Pacific (Richmond, 1997); and as tropical Indo-Pacific in Kalk (1958).

Distribution of Nerita polita include:
 Aldabra
 Chagos
 East Coast of South Africa
 Kenya
 Madagascar
 Mascarene Basin
 Mauritius
 Mozambique
 Red Sea
 Tanzania

Ecology 
The habitat of Nerita polita includes wet fine sandy shore and the littoral fringe of rocky shores.

References
This article incorporates CC-BY-SA-3.0 text from the reference.

 Chambers, M. R. (1980). Zonation, abundance and biomass of gastropods from two Hong Kong Rocky. In: Morton B, editor. Proceedings of the first International workshop on the malacofaunal of Hong Kong and Southern China. Hong Kong University Press, Hong Kong. 139-148
 Kilburn, R.N. & Rippey, E. (1982) Sea Shells of Southern Africa. Macmillan South Africa, Johannesburg, xi + 249 pp
 Steyn, D.G. & Lussi, M. (1998) Marine Shells of South Africa. An Illustrated Collector's Guide to Beached Shells. Ekogilde Publishers, Hartebeespoort, South Africa, ii + 264 pp.
 Fowler, O. (2016). Seashells of the Kenya coast. ConchBooks: Harxheim. Pp. 1–170
 Jarrett, A.G. (2000) Marine Shells of the Seychelles. Carole Green Publishing, Cambridge, xiv + 149 pp. NIZT 682

External links
 Linnaeus, C. (1758). Systema Naturae per regna tria naturae, secundum classes, ordines, genera, species, cum characteribus, differentiis, synonymis, locis. Editio decima, reformata [10th revised edition, vol. 1: 824 pp. Laurentius Salvius: Holmiae.]
 Mörch, O. A. L. (1852-1853). Catalogus conchyliorum quae reliquit D. Alphonso d'Aguirra & Gadea Comes de Yoldi, Regis Daniae Cubiculariorum Princeps, Ordinis Dannebrogici in Prima Classe & Ordinis Caroli Tertii Eques. Fasc. 1, Cephalophora, 170 pp. [1852; Fasc. 2, Acephala, Annulata, Cirripedia, Echinodermata, 74 [+2] pp. [1853]. Hafniae]
 Röding, P.F. (1798). Museum Boltenianum sive Catalogus cimeliorum e tribus regnis naturæ quæ olim collegerat Joa. Fried Bolten, M. D. p. d. per XL. annos proto physicus Hamburgensis. Pars secunda continens Conchylia sive Testacea univalvia, bivalvia & multivalvia. Trapp, Hamburg. viii, 199 pp
 Gmelin J.F. (1791). Vermes. In: Gmelin J.F. (Ed.) Caroli a Linnaei Systema Naturae per Regna Tria Naturae, Ed. 13. Tome 1(6). G.E. Beer, Lipsiae [Leipzig. pp. 3021-3910]
 Issel, A. (1865). Catalogo dei molluschi raccolti dalla missione italiana in Persia aggiuntavi la descrizione delle specie nuove o poco note. Stamperia Reale, Torino, 55 pp

Neritidae
Gastropods described in 1758
Taxa named by Carl Linnaeus